Oka National Park (Parc national d'Oka) is a small provincially administered park, located within the village of Oka and between Pointe-Calumet on one side and Saint-Placide on the other side. on the north shore of Lac des Deux Montagnes in Quebec, Canada. The Park is home to one of the largest heronries in Quebec and the historical site of Calvaire d'Oka (Calvary of Oka) shrine which dates from 1740.

Facilities

It shares territory with the municipality of Oka, which is in the Deux-Montagnes Regional County Municipality and the region of Laurentides. The Park includes beaches and marshes located north of Lac des Deux Montagnes, as well as the Calvaire d'Oka. The Park is traversed by Highway 344 and is also accessible by Quebec Autoroute 640 which ends on Highway 344.

The Oka Calvary trail
The priests of the Sulpician order built seven chapels on the low hills of Oka to mark some of the Stations of the Cross.

See also 
 Société des établissements de plein air du Québec

References
This article was initially translated from the French Wikipedia.

External links
Parc national d'Oka - official site

National parks of Quebec
Tourist attractions in Laurentides
Protected areas of Laurentides